Napoleon Museum may refer to:
 The Louvre, named the Napoleon Museum between 1803-1814
 Maison Bonaparte (Ajaccio, Corsica)
 Palace of Fontainebleau#Museum of Napoleon I
 Napoleon Museum (Havana), Cuba
 Napoleon Museum (Monaco)